The Lola T850 is an open-wheel Formula 2 racing car from the British manufacturer Lola Cars, which was used in the European and Japanese Formula 2 Championships in the early 1980s. It is not Lola's own construction, but a car produced under a license that was developed by competing companies. A variant of the Lola T850 is the Docking Spitzley DS1. Lola also built a version destined for Formula Atlantic, sold as the Toleman TA860.

History
The racing car manufacturer Lola Cars in Huntingdon, founded by Eric Broadley, was represented in the Formula 2 European Championship until the late 1960s, including with the T100 and T102 models, which became known through works commitment by BMW. In the 1970s, Lola then focused primarily on the US racing series and offered only sporadically chassis for Formula 2, which were largely unsuccessful. In 1976, Lola built four Type T450 Formula Two cars, one of which was supplied to the German team ATS Wheels. The drivers failed with him several times in qualifying. The 1977 car built as a one-off successor to Lola T550 was even worse; he did not even manage to take part in the race. Lola's Formula 2 ambitions ended with him.

After a break of several years, Lola returned to Formula 2 at the start of the 1981 season with the T850. It has its origins in a two-year-old construction by Lola's competitor, Ralt. It is based on the Ralt RT2, which ran exclusively for the British Toleman team in the 1979 Formula 2 European Championship. For the 1980 season, Toleman engineer Rory Byrne had further developed the Ralt RT2 into the Toleman TG280; with him, Brian Henton won the championship title that year. The following year, Toleman moved up to Formula 1. The old TG280s were catered to drivers like Jim Crawford and Jo Gartner, who used them with moderate success until 1983. Interest in the cars was so great that Toleman decided to start producing more customer vehicles in the late 1980s. However, because Toleman had no capacity to build Formula 2 customer cars in addition to the Formula 1 commitment, Lola was commissioned to build this new customer TG280s. Lola launched a series of 10 cars and sold them under its own name as the Lola T850 to European and Japanese Formula 2 teams.

After the cars were sold, Lola did not continue her involvement in Formula 2. This made the T850 the last Formula 2 car to bear the Lola name. Only with the introduction of the successor series Formula 3000 in the spring of 1985 did the T950 appears again as a Lola car in the class below Formula 1.

Model designation
The model designation follows the nomenclature that was common at Lola at the time: the last two digits code for the racing series for which the respective model was designed - here: 50 for Formula 2 and 3000 - while the first digit stands for the generation within this group stands. [5] Accordingly, the 850 is the eighth model that Lola designed for Formula 2. However, this is incorrect insofar as there is a jump from the 550 to the 850: there is no Formula 2 cars with the designations Lola 650 and 750.

Design
The construction of the Lola T850 is largely identical to that of the Toleman TG280 from 1981. The car has a monocoque made of aluminum sheets. A double-wishbone axle is installed at the front and rear, with outriggers at the rear. The wheelbase is 2514 mm, and the overall length of the car is 4191 mm. The front track measures 1473 mm and the rear 1422 mm. The cars could - like the TG280 - be equipped with Hart 420R engines; in addition, the use of BMW engines was also possible.

The Lola T850 in the European Formula 2 Championship
The 1981 European Formula 2 season was characterized by the dominance of the works teams March, Maurer, and Ralt. With Project Four and Toleman, two professionally organized and successful private teams left the Formula 2 European Championship at the turn of the year 1980/81. The previous midfield teams gained importance as a result. Two of them, Docking Spitzley and Sanremo Racing, became customers of the Lola T850 in 1981. While the car was able to achieve individual podium places in 1981, it played no longer a significant role in 1982, and in 1983 it was only used as a stopgap.

Docking Spitzley Racing
The British team Docking Spitzley Racing, which had reported two Toleman TG280s as customer cars in 1980, tied in with Toleman's previous role. Docking Spitzley took over three Lola T850s for the 1981 season for Stefan Johansson, Kenny Acheson, and – in the second half of the season – also for Ricardo Londoño-Bridge. The team only received the cars five days before the first race of the year and had little time to prepare for the season opener. Docking Spitzley consistently launched the T850 with Hart engines. After a poor debut at Silverstone, Johansson then won the second championship race at the Hockenheimring; he also won the last race of the season at Mantorp Park in Sweden. With second place in Rome and a few more points in the points, Johansson ended up fourth in the championship behind Geoff Lees in the Werks-Ralt, Thierry Boutsen in the Werks - March and Eje Elgh in the Maurer. This made him the best driver in a customer team. Acheson finished 15th, and Londoño-Bridge scored no championship points.

For the 1982 season, Docking Spitzley revised the Lola T850 in detail. The cars were then no longer reported as Lola in 1982 but as Docking Spitzley DS1.

Sanremo Racing
The Italian Sanremo team, owned by former racer Alberto Colombo, took over a Lola T850 for Guido Pardini for the 1981 season. Carlo Rossi, the team's second driver, drove a used 1980 Toleman TG280. Both cars were equipped with Heidegger BMW engines. In the Lola T850, Pardini performed significantly worse than his teammate: while Rossi finished fourth, fifth and sixth in the old TG280 and finished the championship in 13th place, Pardini retired six times and achieved seventh place in Rome as his best result.

In 1982 Sanremo Racing retained the combination of a Toleman TG280 and a Lola T850 - now two years old. The Hart-engined T850 was initially driven by Eddy Bianchi, the reigning Italian Formula 3 champion, who made his Formula 2 debut at Sanremo that year. His best race result was 8th at Thruxton in Britain. After this race, he had to end his motorsport commitment for financial reasons. His teammate Roberto Del Castello then took over the Lola T850, who had previously driven the old Toleman TG280. Del Castello converted the T850 to a BMW engine. With this combination, he did not finish in the points in the further course of the season.

In 1983, Sanremo started the new season late for financial reasons. The now three-year-old Toleman TG280 and two-year-old Lola T850 filled the gaps for the first few races until the team was able to fall back on two new March 832s. Guido Daccò drove the Lola T850 with a BMW engine in the team's first three races and finished sixth with it again in Rome. That was the last point rank achieved by a T850.

Formula Racing Club
The Lola T850-06 went to the Swiss Formula Racing Club in 1981, who entered it for Lucerne racing driver Fredy Schnarwiler. Schnarwiler drove the car with a Hart engine. He competed in eight races in the 1981 season. He failed in three runs and finished five times. His best position was seventh at the Pau Grand Prix.

In 1982, Schnarwiler reported the T850 to the first two championship races, but only started in the opening race at Silverstone. Here he dropped out after four laps due to a technical defect. There was a report for the subsequent race at the Hockenheimring, but Schnarwiler did not start. This initially ended his Formula 2 engagement. He competed again for the last race of the year in Misano but drove a current March 822.

Docking Spitzley DS1
For the 1982 season, Docking Spitzley had the T850 revised in detail. This affected both the wheel suspension and aerodynamics. Responsible engineers were Frank Dernie and Pat Symonds, who worked primarily on Toleman's Formula 1 car. As in the previous year, the cars started with Hart engines; Drivers were Thierry Tassin and Carlo Rossi.

Tassin finished the opening race in second place, but was later disqualified because the side shooters broke the rules. Two weeks later, Tassin finished sixth at the Hockenheimring; that was the only race of that year that he finished in the points. At the second edition of the Grand Prix de Formule 2 Belgique in Spa-Francorchamps, which took place in heavy rain at times, both drivers came off the track. Tassin had previously been third with Rossi sixth. Both cars were so badly damaged in the accidents that the team had to skip the subsequent championship race at the Hockenheimring. At the next race at the Thruxton Circuit was just rebuilt Tassins DS1; Rossi, on the other hand, drove an old Toleman TG280. Like some of its competitors, the team skipped the eleventh race of the season in Sweden because of the long journey. At the last championship round, Docking Spitzley once again registered both pilots with the DS1, but Tassin missed the qualification. After the end of the season, the Docking-Spitzley team, which had suffered from financial difficulties throughout the year, gave up Formula Two involvement.

The Lola T850 in the Japanese Formula 2 Championship
Contrary to expectations, Lola was only able to sell two T850s in Japan.

Heroes Racing Corporation used a BMW-engined car for Kazuyoshi Hoshino in the Japanese Formula Two Championship in 1981 and 1982. In the first season, which was dominated by contemporary March models and powerful Honda engines, Hoshino managed one win and one-second place, finishing runner-up overall in 1981. Hoshino started the 1982 season again with the T850. After a third place in the opening race and two subsequent failures, he switched to a current March 822 in the summer of 1982, with which he won the fourth championship race. Heroes Racing gave the T850 to Toshio Suzuki for the last two races, who dropped out once and finished ninth once.

After a break of more than a year and a half, two Lola T850s appeared again in the last race of the 1984 season in Suzuka. Both had BMW engines tuned by Toda Racing. One car entered Gear Racing for Norimasa Sakamoto, who finished 14th and last. Maribu Motorsport Club entered the second T850 for Hironobu Tatsumi. Tatsumi was the first driver in the race to drop out.

Toleman TA860/Lola T860
With the North American market in mind, Lola built a Formula Atlantic adapted version of the T850. The car was factory-designated the Lola T860, but was marketed under the Toleman TA860 name. Contrary to expectations, this version was not successful; Lola only sold two cars.

United States
The first TA860 (VIN HU1) was delivered to US Lola agent Carl Haas in June 1981. Jacques Villeneuve Sr. tested the car but did not use it for the current competitions. The TA860 made its racing debut more than a year later at a Formula Atlantic race at Road America, where it was entered by Venezuelan racer Juan Cochesa with a Ford BDN engine. In qualifying, Cochesa finished last; he finished the race as 17. After that, Cochesa gave up the TA860. In 1985, Peter Heckmann entered him for four out of six rounds of the Formula Atlantic Championship East. His best position was fifth in the penultimate championship race at St. Louis International Raceway. In the overall standings, Heckmann took tenth place with 22 points. After that, this TA860 was no longer used in racing.

Australia
The second TA860 (VIN HU2) went to Australian racing driver Peter Williamson. He used it from November 1981 to 1984 in the Australian Formula Pacific Championship, which was called the Australian Formula 1 Championship from 1982 and whose regulations corresponded to those of the American Formula Atlantic. In this version, the TA860 had a Toyota engine. Williamson debuted the car at Calder Park Raceway in November 1981 in the Australian Grand Prix. After an accident on the 15th lap, he had to retire. On the TA860's second outing at Oran Park Raceway in April 1982 Williamson had an accident again. The car was so badly damaged that the T860 had to be rebuilt using a new chassis and was out of action for the rest of the year. In 1983, Williamson contested four out of six rounds of the 1983 Australian Formula One Championship driving the refurbished TA860. His best result was fourth place in the Lakeside race. In the following season there were still some reports, but no more race participation.

Race results in the Formula 2 European Championship

Lola T850

Docking Spitzley DS1

References

Formula Two cars
Open wheel racing cars